Bernard Fabre (born in Albi, on 7 september 1935) is a French former rugby league footballer and coach in the 1950s, 1960s and 1970s. He played as halfback, five-eighths or centre.

Career
Fabre was one of the main players of the France national team between 1957 and 1964.
With Albi he made outstanding performances in the French Championship with two titles won in 1956 and 1962.

Thanks to his club-level performances, he was capped 23 times for France between 1957 and 1964, taking part at prestigious victories against Great Britain and Australia. He was as well the captain of the French team during their 1964 tour.

Biography 
Outside the pitch, he worked as a municipal employee.

Honours

Rugby league 
Team honours
French Champion in 1956 and 1962 (Albi)
Runner-up at the French Championship in 1960 (Albi)

References

External links
Bernard Fabre at rugbyleagueproject.org

 
French rugby league players
French rugby league coaches
France national rugby league team players
Living people
1935 births
Rugby league centres
Rugby league halfbacks
Rugby league five-eighths
Sportspeople from Occitania (administrative region)
Racing Club Albi XIII players